The Saint of Fort Washington is a 1993 American drama film directed by Tim Hunter and starring Matt Dillon and Danny Glover. Dillon won the award for Best Actor at the 1993 Stockholm Film Festival for his performance.

Despite the poor box office returns, The Saint of Fort Washington received positive reviews from critics, with many praising the performances of Dillon and Glover.

Synopsis
Matthew is a young man with a good heart but suffers from sporadic schizophrenic tendencies. He ends up with nowhere to live after a slumlord tears down his tenement. Matthew is forced to reside at Fort Washington Armory, a nearby shelter. Bullied by punks, he turns to a homeless military veteran, Jerry, for help on how to survive. Together they form a friendship that changes both of their lives forever.

Cast
 Danny Glover as Jerry / The Narrator
 Matt Dillon as Matthew
 Rick Aviles as Rosario
 Nina Siemaszko as Tamsen
 Ving Rhames as Leroy "Little Leroy"

Release
The film had its world premiere on September 13, 1993 at the Toronto International Film Festival. It received a limited theatrical release on November 17, 1993.

Reception

Box office
The movie opened at #22, making $19,409. It made a total American gross of $134,454 in its limited release.

Critical reception
The Saint of Fort Washington holds an 80% "Fresh" rating on Rotten Tomatoes based on 10 reviews. 

Roger Ebert gave the movie 3 out of 4 stars, praising Glover and Dillon’s acting. He wrote, "Glover and Dillon make characters who seem comfortable with each other; it is easier to fight the world together. Both actors resist any temptation to reach for pathos in their roles. The Glover character, angered at being cheated out of a small business, has great fury at the world, but has learned mostly to control it; he needs someone to care for, and comes to love the younger man almost as a son. And Dillon, saddled with sainthood in the film's title, plays against sentimentality most of the time." Jonathan Rosenbaum of the Chicago Reader wrote, "This isn’t a perfect movie, and it may occasionally err on the side of Dickensian sentiment, but I it has so much to say about the world we live in and says it with such grace, wit, and raw feeling that I recommend it without qualification."

Janet Maslin of The New York Times was similarly positive, writing "The film's visual backdrop often supplies what its dialogue lacks, as Mr. Hunter -- and the cinematographer Frederick Elmes, creating vivid urban landcapes -- convey a strong sense of the characters' restrictive domain", and concluded the film "works best when it avoids even a hint of the metaphorical and sticks to the plain, hard facts."

Critiques of the film noted that the "particulars of playwright Lyle Kessler’s script often seem phony, contrived and far too politely worked out for the harshness of the conditions on display", and that "drugs, alcohol and crime are never mentioned, and filmmakers offer no clues as to how they think society should regard and, in turn, deal with the homeless in any way other than is now the case." Ebert commented, "The film's flaw, I think, is to spend too much time with the melodrama surrounding the bully of the Fort Washington Shelter." Peter Rainer of the Los Angeles Times opined the screenplay’s "deification" of its characters was unnecessary and that "the filmmakers are so intent on creating a fable that the more realistic aspects of the story lose some of their bite."

Accolades
At the 1993 Toronto International Film Festival, the film came in 2nd place to winning the People’s Choice Award. Matt Dillon was nominated for Best Supporting Actor at the Chicago Film Critics Association Awards and won the Best Actor Award at the Stockholm Film Festival.

References

External links
 
 
 

1993 drama films
1993 films
1990s buddy drama films
Films about homelessness
Films about poverty in the United States
Films about schizophrenia
Fictional portrayals of schizophrenia
Films about veterans
Films set in New York City
Films shot in New York City
Films directed by Tim Hunter
Films scored by James Newton Howard
Warner Bros. films
American drama films
American buddy drama films
1990s English-language films
1990s American films